André Lemaire (born 21 September 1894, date of death unknown) was a Belgian rower. He competed in the men's eight event at the 1928 Summer Olympics.

References

1894 births
Year of death missing
Belgian male rowers
Olympic rowers of Belgium
Rowers at the 1928 Summer Olympics
Place of birth missing